Al-Na'ima was a Palestinian Arab village in the Safad Subdistrict of Mandatory Palestine located  northeast of Safad,  near the al-Hula Plain.  The settlement was depopulated during the 1947-1948 civil war on May 14, 1948 by the Israeli Palmach's First Battalion as part of Operation Yiftach.

In  the 1945 statistics  it had a population of 1,240 of whom 210 were Jews.

History
In 1881,  during the late Ottoman period, the PEF's Survey of Western Palestine described the village as a "Stone and mud village, on the Huleh Plain, containing about 100 Moslems."

British Mandate era
The village had a boys' elementary school.

In the 1931 census of Palestine, conducted by the British Mandate authorities, En Na'ima  had a population of  858, all  Muslims,  in  a total of 174 houses.

Types of land use in dunams in the village in  the 1945 statistics:

The land ownership of the village before occupation in dunams:

1948, and aftermath
During the 1948 war, Al-Na'ima was depopulated during Operation Yiftach which targeted Safad and the surrounding district. When the city of Safad was finally attacked between the 10 and 11 May 1948, morale in the village was low; according to an Israeli intelligence report, many residents fled on 14 May shortly before advancing Israeli troops entered.

The settlement of Neot Mordechai was built in 1946 to the south of the village while to the north is the settlement of Beyt Hillel, built in 1940.

References

Bibliography

External links
Welcome To al-Na'ima
al-Na'ima, Zochrot
al-Na'ima at Khalil Sakakini Cultural Center
Al-Na'ima Dr. Khalil Rizk.
Survey of Western Palestine, Map 2:   IAA, Wikimedia commons

Arab villages depopulated during the 1948 Arab–Israeli War
District of Safad